The Western United States experienced a series of major wildfires in 2020. Severe August thunderstorms ignited numerous wildfires across California, Oregon, and Washington, followed in early September by additional ignitions across the West Coast. The fires caused over $19.884 billion (2020 USD) in damages, including $16.5 billion in property damage and $3.384 billion in fire suppression costs. Climate change and poor forest management practices contributed to the severity of the wildfires.

Background

Fire, environment, and cultural shift 

Save for areas along the Pacific coast and mountain ridgetops, North America tends to be wetter in the east and drier in the west. This creates ideal conditions in the West for lightning sparked and wind driven storms to spread large-scale, seasonal wildfires. Human societies practicing cultural burns developed in these conditions. Various Indigenous controlled fire practices, as well as their adoption by settlers, were curtailed and outlawed during the European colonization of the Americas, culminating with the modern fire suppression era, signified by the Weeks Act of 1911, which formalized paradigmatic changes in ecosystem priorities and management. Land was protected from fire, and vegetation accumulated near settlements, increasing the risk of explosive, smoky conflagrations.

Many indigenous tribes, including the Karuk, have passed down cultural memories of adaptations to fire-prone ecosystems, including cultural burning. In the last few decades, these have been acknowledged by the United States Forest Service, NOAA, and other agencies in American colonial nations.

While lightning sparked ignitions are typical of fire-prone ecosystems, higher human population and increased development in the wildland–urban interface has increased accidental and intentional sparking of destructive fires.

Record hemispheric heat 

Record dry weather struck the Western United States in late 2019, extending all the way through the winter of 2020. The lack of precipitation prompted concerns from state governments and the press. On March 22, a state of emergency was declared by California Governor Gavin Newsom due to a mass die-off of trees throughout the state, potentially increasing the risk of wildfire. Oregon officially declared the start of their wildfire season that same month. Despite light rain in late March and April, severe drought conditions persisted, and were predicted to last late into the year, due to a delayed wet season. After fires began in Washington in April, several more fires occurred throughout the West Coast, prompting burn ban restrictions in Washington and Oregon, come July.

Year-to-date wildfire figures
United States agencies stationed at the National Interagency Fire Center in Idaho maintain a "National Large Incident Year-to-Date Report" on wildfires, delineating 10 sub-national areas, aggregating the regional and national totals of burn size, fire suppression cost, and razed structure count, among other data. As of October 21, "Coordination Centers" of each geography report the following:

Note: Check primary sources for up-to-date statistics. This data is not final and may contain duplicate reports until the data is finalized around January 2021.

Timeline of events

Initial ignitions and weather conditions

April saw the beginning of wildfires in the west coast, as Washington experienced two fires: the Stanwood Bryant Fire in Snohomish County and the Porter Creek Fire in Whatcom County. The Oregon Department of Forestry declared fire season beginning July 5, 2020, signaling the end of unregulated debris burning outdoors, a major cause of wildfires.

Between July 16 and 30, the Washington State Department of Natural Resources (DNR) and many county governments – including Mason, Thurston, King, Pierce and Whatcom Counties – issued fire safety burn bans due to elevated risk of uncontrolled fires.  In late July, a brush fire in Chelan County, the Colockum Fire, burned at least  and caused homes to be evacuated. A fire on the Colville Reservation near Nespelem called the Greenhouse Fire burned at least  and caused the evacuation of the Colville Tribal Corrections Facility and other structures.

Between August 14 and 16, Northern California was subjected to record-breaking warm temperatures, due to anomalously strong high pressure over the region. Early on August 15, the National Weather Service for San Francisco issued a Fire Weather Watch highlighting the risk of wildfire starts due to the combination of lightning risk due to moist, unstable air aloft, dry fuels, and hot temperatures near the surface. Later that day, the Fire Weather Watch was upgraded to a Red Flag Warning, noting the risk of abundant lightning already apparent as the storms moved toward the region from the south.

In mid-August, the remnants of Tropical Storm Fausto interacted with the jet stream, resulting in a large plume of moisture moving northward towards the West Coast of the U.S., triggering a massive siege of lightning storms in Northern California, and setting the conditions for wildfires elsewhere. This moisture then interacted with a high-pressure ridge situated over Nevada that was bringing a long-track heat wave to much of California and the West. These colliding weather systems then created excessive atmospheric instability that generated massive thunderstorms throughout much of Northern and Central California. Additionally, much of these storms were only accompanied with dry lightning and produced little to no rain, making conditions very favorable for wildfires to spark and spread rapidly.

As a result of the fires, on August 19, Governors Kate Brown and Jay Inslee declared a state of emergency for Oregon and Washington respectively.

Growth of fires 

By August 20, the Palmer Fire near Oroville, Washington – which started August 18 – had reached  and forced evacuation of up to 85 homes. The largest of the fires in the Olympics reached  by August 20.

The Evans Canyon Fire, a few miles north of Naches, began around August 31 and expanded to tens of thousands of acres, shut down Washington State Route 821 in the Yakima River Canyon, burned several homes and caused hundreds of families to evacuate, and caused unhealthy air quality in Yakima County. By September 6, it had burned almost .

The August 2020 lightning fires include three of the largest wildfires in the recorded history of California: the SCU Lightning Complex, the August Complex, and the LNU Lightning Complex.

In early September 2020, a combination of a record-breaking heat wave, and Diablo and Santa Ana winds sparked more fires and explosively grew active fires, with the August Complex surpassing the 2018 Mendocino Complex to become California's largest recorded wildfire. The North Complex increased in size as the winds fanned it westward, threatening the city of Oroville, and triggering mass evacuations. As of September 13,  had burned in the state. On September 5, heat from the Creek Fire generated a large pyrocumulonimbus cloud, described as one of the largest seen in the United States.

On September 7, a "historic fire event" with high winds resulted in 80 fires and nearly  burned in a day. Malden, in the Palouse Country of Eastern Washington, was mostly destroyed by one of the fires. Smoke blanketed the Seattle area on September 8 and caused unhealthy air conditions throughout the Puget Sound region, and affected Southwest British Columbia.

On September 8, 2020, in Salem, Oregon, dark red skies as a result of smoke were visible beginning in the late morning. On September 9, 2020, San Francisco and Eureka, California were similarly affected, with dark orange skies reported.

The cities of Phoenix and Talent in Oregon were substantially destroyed by the Almeda Drive Fire. State-wide, at least 23 people have been killed. On September 11, authorities said they were preparing for a mass fatality incident. As of September 11, 600 homes and 100 commercial buildings have been destroyed by the Almeda Drive Fire. Officials stated that the Almeda Drive Fire was human-caused. On September 11, a man was arrested for arson, for allegedly starting a fire that destroyed multiple homes in Phoenix and merged with the Almeda Drive Fire. A separate criminal investigation into the origin point of the Almeda Drive Fire in Ashland is ongoing.

Around September 11–12, wildfires were starting to encroach upon the Clackamas County suburbs of Portland, Oregon, especially the fast-moving Riverside Fire which had already jumped the nearby community of Estacada, but shifting wind directions kept the fire away from the main Portland area.

This was unprecedented for those two states, which combined only saw a total of 26 large fires from 1997 to 2019. On September 22, 10 large fires, each of at least 100,000 acres, were burning across California, including 5 of the 10 largest wildfires in the state's history.

Evacuations 

The first evacuations began on September 4, when almost 200 people were airlifted out of the Sierra National Forest due to the rapidly exploding Creek Fire. Then on September 9, most of the southern area of the city of Medford, Oregon was forced to evacuate and almost all of the 80,000 residents living in the city were told to be ready if necessary because of the uncontained Almeda Drive Fire, which was fast encroaching on their city. As of September 11, about 40,000 people in Oregon had been instructed to evacuate, and 500,000, accounting for about 10% of the state's population, had received instructions to prepare for evacuation, being under a Level 1, 2, or 3 fire evacuation alert.

List of wildfires 

Causes

Fire policy 
Prior to development, California fires regularly burned significantly more acreage than in recent history. Wildfires have been aggressively suppressed in the last century, resulting in a buildup of fuel, increasing the risk of large uncontrollable fires. There is broad scientific consensus that there should be more controlled burning of forest in California in order to reduce fire risk. Controlled burning is hampered by wildfire litigation models that present wildfires in court cases as the result of careless ignition events while discounting underlying forest conditions. A 2020 ProPublica investigation blamed the culture of Cal Fire, greed on the part of fire suppression contractors, and risk aversion on the part of the U.S. Forest Service from preventing appropriate controlled burns from taking place.

Climate change 

Climate change has led to increased heat waves and the risk of drought in California, creating the conditions for more frequent and severe wildfires. It has been observed that since the early 1970s, warm‐season days in California warmed by ca. 1.4 °C. This significantly increases the atmospheric vapor pressure deficit, the difference between the actual and a maximum moisture content for a certain temperature. Trends simulated by climate models are consistent with human-induced trends. Summer forest‐fire area reacts to the vapor pressure deficit exponentially, i.e., warming has grown increasingly impactful.

David Romps, director of the Berkeley Atmospheric Sciences Center summarizes the situation as follows: "To cut to the chase: Were the heat wave and the lightning strikes and the dryness of the vegetation affected by global warming? Absolutely yes. Were they made significantly hotter, more numerous, and drier because of global warming? Yes, likely yes, and yes." Similarly, Friederike Otto, acting director of the University of Oxford Environmental Change Institute states, "There is absolutely no doubt that the extremely high temperatures are higher than they would have been without human-induced climate change. A huge body of attribution literature demonstrates now that climate change is an absolute game-changer when it comes to heat waves, and California won't be the exception." Susan Clark, director of the Sustainability Initiative at the University at Buffalo, states, "This is climate change. This increased intensity and frequency of temperatures and heat waves are part of the projections for the future. [...] There is going to be more morbidity and mortality [from heat.] There are going to be more extremes."

Arson 
In August 2020, a suspect was charged by the Monterey County Sheriff with arson relating to the Dolan Fire; however, this has not been officially determined as the cause of the fire. In April 2021, another suspect, already arrested and charged for the murder of a woman, was charged with arson relating to the Markley Fire, one of the wildfires involving in the LNU Lightning Complex fires; according to authorities, the fire was set to cover up the aforementioned murder. Arson has also been suspected as the cause of the Ranch 2 Fire in Los Angeles County.

Obstacles to fire control

Rumors about political extremist involvement 
In Oregon, false rumors spread that Antifa activists allegedly involved in arson and rioting accompanying the nearby George Floyd protests in Portland, Oregon, were deliberately setting fires and were preparing to loot property that was being evacuated. Some residents refused to evacuate based on the rumors. Authorities urged residents to ignore the rumors and follow evacuation orders, noting that firefighters' lives could be endangered rescuing those who remained. QAnon followers participated in spreading the rumors, with one claim that six antifa activists had been arrested for setting fires specifically amplified by "Q", the anonymous person or people behind QAnon.

Rumors also circulated that members of far-right groups such as the Proud Boys had started some of the fires. However, authorities labelled the claims as false, saying that people needed to question claims they found on social media.

There have been a number of arrests for arson surrounding the wildfires, but there is no indication that the incidents were connected to a mass arson campaign, according to multiple law enforcement officers. For example, a man allegedly set fires in Glide, Oregon, after a Douglas Forest Protection Association member refused to give him a ride to town.

COVID-19 pandemic 
The COVID-19 pandemic brought new challenges for firefighters fighting wildfires due to measures intended to reduce the transmission of the disease. The California Department of Forestry and Fire Protection (CAL Fire) implemented new protocols such as wearing face masks and maintaining social distancing while resting, and reducing the number of occupants in the pickup trucks used to transport firefighters.

California relies heavily on inmate firefighters, with incarcerated people making up nearly a quarter of CAL FIRE's total workforce in 2018–2019. Coronavirus measures within the prison system, such as early release and quarantine policies, have reduced the number of inmate firefighters available, necessitating the hiring of additional seasonal firefighters.

Impacts

Fire 

The towns of Phoenix and Talent were mostly destroyed in the Almeda fire on September 8. In Washington, 2020 wildfires burned , with 418 structures, including 195 homes, burned. In California, about  burned from wildfires in 2020, the highest burned acreage ever recorded in a fire season. About  burned in the August lighting wildfires and  more in September. 4,200 structures were destroyed the whole year in California, and 25 people were killed.

Smoke and air pollution 

The fires resulted in worsened air pollution across much of the western U.S. and Canada, from Los Angeles to British Columbia. Alaska Airlines suspended its flights from Portland, Oregon, and Spokane, Washington, due to poor air quality. Some cities in Oregon recorded air quality readings of over 500 on the AQI scale, while readings of over 200 were recorded in major cities. Smoke from the fires were carried to the East Coast and Europe, causing yellowed skies but having little impact on air quality.

The heavy smoke had resulted in several smoke-related incidents. In California, for example, a San Francisco resident was hiking through Yosemite National Park on September 5 when suddenly the sky turned a dark, ugly color and the temperature dropped greatly, reminiscent of a thunderstorm. Ash and smoke started falling, and this erratic weather was caused by the nearby Creek Fire. In another incident, on September 14, an Oakland A's player was at a game at the Seattle Mariners' stadium, when suddenly in the middle of the game he started gasping for air.

It is estimated that as many as 1,200 to 3,000 indirect deaths have been caused by the adverse effects of smoke inhalation.

Red skies have appeared over many cities over the West Coast, due to smoke from the wildfires blocking lighter colors, created from light infraction. Due to the complex oxidative chemistry occurring during the transport of wildfire smoke in the atmosphere, the toxicity of emissions was suggested to increase over time.

Ecological effects 
The unique sagebrush scrub habitat of the Columbia Basin in Washington was heavily affected by the fires, devastating populations of the endemic Columbia Basin pygmy rabbit and endangered, isolated populations of greater sage-grouse and Columbian sharp-tailed grouse. About half of the pygmy rabbit population and over 30-70% of the grouse population may have been lost to the fires, reversing decades of conservation work. Aside from climate change, the spread of the fires may have been assisted by the intrusion of invasive cheatgrass into the habitats. Fires in old-growth forests of Oregon may negatively affect the populations of the endangered northern spotted owl and pine marten, and the resulting ash from the fires may be washed into streams and threaten endangered salmon. Climate change also reduces the likelihood of forests re-establishing themselves after a fire.

The Cassia Crossbill may lose half its population due to the pending consequences of the wildfires, one of which engulfed a large portion of the South Hills, one of the only two strongholds for the bird.

See also
2020s in environmental history

Other wildfires
 2020 wildfire season
 2020 Brazil rainforest wildfires
 2019–20 Australian bushfire season
 2019 Amazon rainforest wildfires
 2019 Siberia wildfires
 List of California wildfires

General
 2020 in the environment and environmental sciences
 Emergency evacuation procedures during the COVID-19 pandemic

References

External links 

 Current fire information —California Department of Forestry and Fire Protection (CAL FIRE)
 SDSC WiFire Interactive Map—San Diego Supercomputer Center
 Active Fire map of United States at nwcg.gov
 Washington wildfires, Washington State Department of Natural Resources

2020 wildfires in the United States
Wildfires in California
Wildfires in Oregon
Wildfires in Washington (state)
Wildfires in Arizona
Wildfires in Utah
Wildfires in Montana
2020 California wildfires
Effects of climate change
California, 2020
2020
2020 in Oregon
2020 Oregon wildfires
2020 Washington (state) wildfires
Wildfires
2020
Articles containing video clips
2020 disasters in Canada
2020 in British Columbia
West